Jari Laukkanen (born June 21, 1967) is a Finnish former professional ice hockey defenceman.

Laukkanen played 12 seasons in the SM-liiga, registering 138 goals, 195 assists, 333 points, and 301 penalty minutes, while playing 561 games with three teams between 1988–89 and 2001–02.

On August 29, 2012, Laukkanen replaced Tuomas Tuokkola as the head coach for KalPa. The following season, on February 27, 2014, Laukkanen was replaced mid-season by Anssi Laine.

Career statistics

References

External links

1967 births
Living people
Finnish ice hockey coaches
Finnish ice hockey right wingers
KalPa players
Oulun Kärpät players
HPK players
Ice hockey people from Helsinki